Venton Jones is an American politician. He serves as a Democratic member for the 100th district of the Texas House of Representatives.

Life and career 
Jones attended Texas A&M University and the University of Texas at Arlington.

Jones is HIV-positive.

In March 2022, Jones defeated Daniel Clayton and Marquis Hawkins in the Democratic primary election for the 100th district of the Texas House of Representatives along with Sandra Crenshaw. In May 2022, he defeated Crenshaw in the Democratic primary runoff election.

In November 2022, Jones defeated Joe Roberts in the general election, winning 85 percent of the votes. He succeeded Jasmine Crockett. He assumed office in 2023.

References 

Living people
Place of birth missing (living people)
Year of birth missing (living people)
Democratic Party members of the Texas House of Representatives
21st-century American politicians
Texas A&M University alumni
University of Texas at Arlington alumni
21st-century African-American politicians